Mateo Bajamich (born 3 August 1999) is an Argentine professional footballer who plays as a winger for Primera Nacional side Estudiantes de Río Cuarto. He can also play as a striker.

Career

Instituto
Bajamich's career started with Instituto Atlético Central Córdoba, joining in 2016 from his local club Unión de Morrison. Ahead of the 2018–19 Primera B Nacional season, Bajamich was promoted to the Instituto first team.  He made his Instituto debut on 23 February 2019, coming on as a substitute in a 3–2 defeat to Nueva Chicago.  Bajamich was a late addition to the match day squad after Facundo Affranchino was injured in the pre-match warm up.  He had previously been an unused substitute in 2018 for matches with Villa Dálmine and Arsenal de Sarandí. Bajamich made his first start in senior football in a 1–0 loss against Guillermo Brown on 3 March 2019. On 21 April, he scored his first professional goal in the final match of the season in a 1–1 draw against Gimnasia y Esgrima (M). Bajamich and Instituto finished the 2018–19 season 22nd in the league table.  After the season, he signed a contract with Instituto lasting until 2022.

Bajamich netted four goals in his first five games to start the 2019–20 season, including a brace in a 3–0 win at Brown de Adrogué on 14 September 2019.   He scored twice again on 9 November in a 2–0 win against Santamarina.  On 15 March Bajamich scored once to help La Gloria defeat Tigre 3–0.  That would end up being the final game of the season for Instituto as the season was cancelled due to the COVID-19 pandemic.  Bajamich ended the season with 9 goals and 3 assists from 21 games, helping Instituto finish 9th in group B.

Houston Dynamo
On 5 October 2020, Bajamich joined the Houston Dynamo of Major League Soccer.  The transfer fee is reportedly $1,200,000, with Instituto receiving 20% of his next sale.  The contract with Houston lasts until 2022, with the Dynamo having team options until 2025.

Instituto loan
On 9 November 2020, Bajamich was loaned back to Instituto until 21 January, 2021, prior to the start of Houston's pre-season. He scored on his first appearance back, netting the opener in a 2–1 victory over Chacarita Juniors on 28 November. He scored again on 27 December in a 1–1 draw against Gimnasia y Esgrima (J). Bajamich made a total of eight appearances on loan, scoring twice, as Instituto lost in the first round of the promotion play-offs to Defensores de Belgrano.

Return to Houston 
Bajamich made his Dynamo debut on 15 May 2021, coming off the bench in a 3–1 loss to the Colorado Rapids.  He recorded his first assist for the Dynamo on 29 May in a 3–2 loss to Sporting Kansas City.  Bajamich ended the season with 1 assist in 9 appearances, as Houston finished last in the Western Conference, missing out on the playoffs.

Loan to Huracán
On 28 January 2022, Bajamich was again loaned out by Houston. He returned to Argentina, joining Huracán on loan for the season with Huracán holding a purchase option.  Bajamich made his debut for Huracán on 15 February, coming off the bench in a 3–2 loss to Estudiantes de la Plata in a Copa de la Liga Profesional match.  Bajamich made 9 appearances while with Huracán, all in the Copa de La Liga Profesional.

On 7 November 2022, Houston declined Bajamich's contract option for 2023, making him a free agent.

Estudiantes de Río Cuarto 
On 16 January 2023, Bajamich signed with Estudiantes de Río Cuarto in Primera Nacional.  He made his debut for Estudiantes (RC) on 11 February, coming off the bench in a 2–0 loss to CA Temperley.  On 17 February, Bajamich scored his first goal for el Celeste in a 2–2 draw with San Telmo.

Personal life
Born in Argentina, Bajamich is of Croatian descent. In 1921, his great-grandfather Mariano Bajamich left Trnbusi, Croatia (then part of Yugoslavia) and moved to Argentina where he married a Spaniard named Carmen. Bajamich expressed his desire to play for the Croatian national team. In 2020, he received the Croatian citizenship.

Career statistics

References

External links

1999 births
Living people
Sportspeople from Córdoba Province, Argentina
Argentine footballers
Argentine expatriate footballers
Argentine people of Croatian descent
Argentine people of Spanish descent
Association football forwards
Instituto footballers
Houston Dynamo FC players
Club Atlético Huracán footballers
Primera Nacional players
Major League Soccer players
Argentine Primera División players
Expatriate soccer players in the United States
Argentine expatriate sportspeople in the United States